David Bruce Wohl (born November 2, 1949) is an American former basketball player and coach, and the former general manager of the Los Angeles Clippers.  A 6'2" guard who grew up in East Brunswick, New Jersey and played collegiately at the University of Pennsylvania, Wohl was selected in the 3rd round of the 1971 NBA draft by the Philadelphia 76ers. He played for six different teams over a seven-year career, including the 76ers, the Portland Trail Blazers, the Buffalo Braves, the Houston Rockets and the New York/New Jersey Nets.

After serving as an assistant coach for the Nets in 1978–1979, Wohl was hired as the head coach of the Philadelphia Fox in the Women's Professional Basketball League for the 1979–1980 season. He would later coach the Nets for over two seasons, from 1985 to 1987.  In addition, he has been an assistant coach for several teams. He was also the Executive Vice President of Basketball Operations for the Miami Heat from 1995 to 1997. From 2004 to 2007, Wohl was an assistant coach for the Boston Celtics. From 2007 to 2009 he was the team's Assistant General Manager. He was an assistant coach with the Minnesota Timberwolves from 2009 to 2011.

On June 16, 2014, Wohl became general manager of the Clippers.  The move reunited him with Clippers head coach Doc Rivers; Wohl was an assistant on Rivers' staff in Orlando and Boston.  Although Wohl has the title of general manager, he served mostly in an advisory role to Rivers, who as President of Basketball Operations had the final say on all basketball matters.

In the 2016 NBA Draft, Wohl's draft selections included Forward Brice Johnson in the first round and both Diamond Stone and David Michineau in the 2nd round. Guard David Michineau was not signed for the 2016–17 NBA season following a sub-par NBA Summer League performance with the team in Orlando.

On August 24, 2017, Wohl was replaced by Oklahoma City Thunder assistant general manager Michael Winger.

Head Coaching Record 

|-
| style="text-align:left;"|New Jersey
| style="text-align:left;"|
|82||39||43||.476|| style="text-align:center;"|3rd in Atlantic||0||0||3||
| style="text-align:center;"|Lost in First Round
|-
| style="text-align:left;"|New Jersey
| style="text-align:left;"|
|82||24||58||.298|| style="text-align:center;"|4th in Atlantic||—||—||—||—
| style="text-align:center;"|Missed Playoff
|-
| style="text-align:left;"|New Jersey
| style="text-align:left;"|
|15||2||13||.133|| style="text-align:center;"|(Fired)||—||—||—||—
| style="text-align:center;"|—
|-
| style="text-align:center;" colspan="2" |Career
|179||65||114|||| ||3||0||3||||

References

External links
 BasketballReference.com: Dave Wohl (as coach)
 BasketballReference.com: Dave Wohl (as player)
 NBA.com Coaches File: Dave Wohl

1949 births
Living people
American men's basketball coaches
American men's basketball players
Basketball coaches from New Jersey
Basketball players from New Jersey
Basketball players from New York (state)
Boston Celtics assistant coaches
Boston Celtics executives
Buffalo Braves players
East Brunswick High School alumni
Houston Rockets players
Los Angeles Lakers assistant coaches
Los Angeles Clippers executives
Miami Heat assistant coaches
Miami Heat announcers
Minnesota Timberwolves assistant coaches
National Basketball Association general managers
New Jersey Nets head coaches
New Jersey Nets players
Orlando Magic assistant coaches
Penn Quakers men's basketball players
People from East Brunswick, New Jersey
Philadelphia 76ers draft picks
Philadelphia 76ers players
Point guards
Portland Trail Blazers players
Sportspeople from Middlesex County, New Jersey
Women's Professional Basketball League coaches